The Multinational Force and Observers Medal is an international military decoration which was first created on March 24, 1982. The medal was established under the authority of the Director-General of the Multinational Force and Observers (MFO) which were established to monitor a neutral ceasefire zone, between Egypt and Israel, as the result of the Yom Kippur War of 1973.

Clasps and Bars 
Silver numerals, beginning with numeral '2', worn on the medal ribbon are awarded for additional periods of service with the same mission.

Manner of wear

Australian Defence Force 
The Multinational Force and Observers Medal is authorized to be worn as a foreign medal for the Australian Defence Force (ADF). The medal is worn after Australian medals, with other foreign awards, in the order of date of receipt.

British Armed Forces 
Prior to 2017, The Multinational Force and Observers Medal could not be worn by British Forces personnel. However, in 2017 authority was given for the medal to be worn alongside other British awards and medals but being a foreign medal, is to be worn after all other British medals. The authority to wear the medal has been given retrospectively to all those who served for 170 days or more with the MFO since 1982.

Canadian Forces 
The Multinational Force and Observers Medal is considered an authorized medal within the International Mission Medals category (located after NATO Awards and before Commemorative Awards) for the Canadian Forces (CF).  Its order of precedence within the International Missions Medals category is based on date of award (1982–present) and may be worn directly after the International Commission of Control and Supervision Medal (1973) and before the European Community Monitor Mission Medal for Yugoslavia (1991).

New Zealand Defence Force 
The Multinational Force and Observers Medal is considered an authorized medal for the New Zealand Defence Force (NZDF) within the Foreign Medals category, the last category in the New Zealand order of precedence.  The MFO Medal is worn directly after the Kuwait Liberation Medal and the Korean War Service Medal.

United States Armed Forces 
The United States military began issuing the Multinational Force and Observers Medal on July 28, 1982.  The medal was made retroactive to August 1981 and was presented to any United States service member who served at least ninety cumulative days as a member of the Multinational Force and Observers.  On March 15, 1985, the time period was increased to a minimum of 170 days.  The time frame could be waived if the award was presented posthumously, a service member was medically evacuated from the region, or if the Director-General of the Multinational Force and Observers presented the award for a specific act or special case.

The Multinational Force and Observers Medal is authorized for wear as a United States military award under the category of "Non-U.S. service award" and is worn after all U.S. decorations and before foreign awards of individual countries.  Multiple presentations are denoted by award numerals.  Similar international military decorations include the NATO Service Medals and the United Nations Service Medals.

Precedence
Some orders of precedence are as follows:

References

External links
 Multinational Force & Observers website
 US Army Institute of Heraldry

Medals of the Multinational Force and Observers